The 2010–11 Copa del Rey was the 109th staging of the Copa del Rey (including two seasons where two rival editions were played). The competition began on 21 August 2010 and ended on 20 April 2011 with the final, held at the Estadio Mestalla in Valencia, in which Real Madrid lifted the trophy for the eighteenth time in their history with a 1–0 victory over Barcelona in extra time. Sevilla were the defending champions, but they were defeated by Real Madrid in the semi-finals.

Calendar

Qualified teams
The following teams competed in the Copa del Rey 2010–11:

20 teams of 2009–10 La Liga:

Almería
Athletic Bilbao
Atlético Madrid
Barcelona
Deportivo La Coruña
Espanyol
Getafe
Málaga
Mallorca
Osasuna
Racing Santander
Real Madrid
Sevilla
Sporting Gijón
Tenerife
Valencia
Valladolid
Villarreal
Xerez
Zaragoza

21 teams of 2009–10 Segunda División (Villarreal B are excluded for being a reserve team of Villarreal):

Albacete
Betis
Cádiz
Cartagena
Castellón
Celta
Córdoba
Elche
Gimnàstic de Tarragona
Girona
Hércules
Huesca
Las Palmas
Levante
Murcia
Numancia
Rayo Vallecano
Real Sociedad
Real Unión
Recreativo Huelva
Salamanca

24 teams of 2009–10 Segunda División B. Teams that qualified are the top five teams of each of the 4 groups (excluding reserve teams) and the four with the highest number of points out of the remaining non-reserve teams (*):

Ponferradina
Eibar
Palencia
Pontevedra
Alavés
Alcorcón
Real Oviedo
Guadalajara
Universidad Las Palmas
Leganés
Sant Andreu
Ontinyent
Alcoyano
Dénia
Benidorm
Granada
Melilla
Real Jaén
Poli Ejido
Ceuta
Puertollano*
Orihuela*
UD Logroñés*
Lucena*

18 teams of 2009–10 Tercera División. Teams that qualified are the champions of each of the 18 groups (or at least the ones with the highest number of points within their group since reserve teams are excluded):

Cerceda
Caudal
Noja
Portugalete
L'Hospitalet
Gandía
Parla
Burgos
Atl. Mancha Real
CD Alcalá
Atl. Baleares
Corralejo
Jumilla
Badajoz
Tudelano
Oyonesa
Teruel
La Roda

First round
The matches were played on 21, 22, 24 and 25 August 2010.

|}
Alcoyano, Cerceda, Jumilla, Lucena, Melilla, Poli Ejido and Real Jaén received a bye.

Second round
The matches were played on 1 September 2010.

Orihuela received a bye.

Third round
The matches were played on 8 and 15 September 2010.

Portugalete received a bye.

Final phase

Draw
The draw for the Round of 32 was held on 22 September 2010 at 13:00 CET in the Ciudad del Fútbol de Las Rozas in Madrid.

Pot 1 teams (Segunda B and Tercera divisions) were drawn against four teams from pot 2 with the first leg at pot 1 team's home. The three remaining teams in pot 1 were paired in the same way with the pot 3 teams. The teams in the special pot 1 (Segunda A) were drawn against five teams in the special pot 2, with the first leg at the home ground of the special pot 1 teams. The remaining teams in the special pot 2 faced each other

Bracket

Round of 32
The first leg matches were played on 26, 27 and 28 October while the second legs were played on 9, 10 and 11 November 2010.

|}

First leg

Second leg

Round of 16
The draw for the Round of 16, Quarterfinals and Semifinals was held on 18 November 2010 at 13:00 CET in the Ciudad del Fútbol de Las Rozas in Madrid.

The first leg matches were played on 21 and 22 December while the second legs were played on 5 and 6 January 2011.

|}

First leg

Second leg

Quarter-finals
The first leg matches were played on 12 and 13 January while the second legs were played on 18, 19 and 20 January 2011.

|}

First leg

Second leg

Semi-finals
The first leg matches were played on 26 January while the second legs were played on 2 February 2011.

|}

First leg

Second leg

Final

Top goalscorers

References

External links

MundoDeportivo.com 
Marca.com 
AS.com 

2010-11
1